Lovehoney is a British business that sells sex toys, lingerie and erotic gifts on the Internet. Their tagline is "the sexual happiness people". 
In addition to retailing, Lovehoney has over 400 own brand products and does development and publicity.
In 2014 the company was the focus of a television show entitled Frisky Business, which looked at their day-to-day operations.

Background
Lovehoney was founded in Bath, Somerset in 2002 by Richard Longhurst (former editor of .net magazine and PC Format) and Neal Slateford (former member of DNA). The company employs 230 people in the area, and is an official UK distributor of Durex products.

In 2009–10 Lovehoney had a turnover of £10.4 million and profits of £1.5 million In 2010-11 it had a turnover of £13.4 million, and in 2011-12 it had a turnover of £16 million.

History 

Lovehoney launched its online store in 2002, operating from Richard Longhurst's bedroom.
The next year Lovehoney moved into a small warehouse, and became a limited company.

Lovehoney developed its first product in 2005, a music-activated vibrator called iBuzz; and in 2006 Apple Inc. threatened to sue Lovehoney over the iBuzz.

In 2007, Lovehoney launched the world's first sex toy recycling scheme, called Rabbit Amnesty.

In 2009, Lovehoney announced the first Lovehoney Design A Sex Toy Competition. The winner of that competition was Trevor Murphy with the Sqweel Oral Sex Simulator. The Lovehoney Sqweel Oral Sex Simulator is the best selling oral sex simulation sex toy in the world. Lovehoney USA was launched to sell Lovehoney own brand products wholesale to the United States.

In 2011, Lovehoney expanded its warehouse and workforce and the company is rebranded, with the cartoon mascot "Honey" being dropped and the tagline "the sexual happiness people" adopted.
Lovehoney was featured in a Channel 4 documentary titled "More Sex Please, We're British" in 2012.
Also in 2012 – Lovehoney secured exclusive world rights outside the Americas to design, manufacture and sell adult pleasure products based on the Fifty Shades trilogy by E. L. James.

In 2013, Lovehoney a television advertisement was the first ever commercial to say "sex toys" on British television. 

Lovehoney released television show "Frisky Business" in 2014, where viewers get an inside look into the Lovehoney business.

Retail 
Lovehoney has over 400 own brand products, including the Lovehoney Sqweel Oral Sex Simulator (the first winner of Lovehoney's Design A Sex Toy competition). Sub-brands owned by Lovehoney include BASIC Sex Toys, Bondage Boutique, Death By Orgasm, Pin Ups, Shag Factory, Swoon, VibraExciter and a range of sex toys developed with Tracey Cox.

Lovehoney Ltd holds the official license to design, manufacture and sell adult pleasure products based on the Fifty Shades trilogy by E. L. James. This includes the Fifty Shades of Grey Official Pleasure Collection and Fifty Shades of Grey Sensual Care Collection. Lovehoney also hold the official license to design, manufacture and sell adult pleasure products inspired by Bettie Page.

Notes and references

External links 
Lovehoney UK Official site
Lovehoney US Official Site
Lovehoney AU Official Site
Sexplore UK Official Site

Retail companies established in 2002
Internet properties established in 2002
Mail-order retailers
Online retailers of the United Kingdom
Sex shops
Companies based in Bath, Somerset
2002 establishments in the United Kingdom